Bandivan is a village in the Amasia Municipality of the Shirak Province of Armenia. The Statistical Committee of Armenia reported its population was 245 in 2010, down from 269 at the 2001 census.

Population
The population of the village since 1831 is as follows:

References 

Communities in Shirak Province
Populated places in Shirak Province